Iván Segarra Báez (July 10, 1967 - October 19, 2022) was a Puerto Rican novelist and poet. He wrote books of poems: Candela (1997), Entre tu cuerpo y mi alma (2000) and Hay veces que llora el mar (2001) and novels.

Works
Báez poetry books were being published since 1997 and include Candela (1997), Entre tu cuerpo y mi alma (2000) and Hay veces que llora el mar (2001).

His first novel, El Guardián de la Lujuria, was published in 2003. In Trento, Italy, the publishing house Edizioni Universum awarded him the Libro d' Oro, diploma di Merito for this work January 29, 2003. His second novel is titled La República del Generalísimo and was published in 2004.

Báez's third book, published in 2005 is Ante la luz de un amor prohibido and is a collection of four poems.

Báez was the Director of Revista Literaria de Puerto Rico, the Literary Magazine of Puerto Rico and a member of Grupo Embeleco Poético. 

His book Los hijos del desastre, about a society that is destroyed by capitalism, was published in 2017.

Personal life
Báez was born in Caguas, Puerto Rico on July 10, 1967 and died on October 19, 2022.

See also
 List of Puerto Rican writers
 List of Puerto Ricans
 Puerto Rican literature

References

Bibliography

1967 births
2022 deaths
People from Caguas, Puerto Rico
Puerto Rican poets
Puerto Rican male writers
21st-century American poets
21st-century American male writers